Norbert Csiki (born 21 May 1991) is a Hungarian football player who plays for Balassagyarmat.

He joined English club Oldham Athletic on loan in 2009 as part of an agreement between Oldham, MTK and Liverpool. He joined the club's new Development squad. He was given the no. 35 squad number and was named as substitute for the first-team on a number of occasions.  In February 2010 he returned to MTK after his loan period was cut short.

In January 2016 he joined Thai Premier League side Sisaket F.C.

International career
Csiki has represented Hungary at international level as an under-17 and under-18.

Club statistics

Updated to games played as of 7 February 2022.

References

External links
Profile at HLSZ 
Profile at MLSZ 

1991 births
Living people
Footballers from Budapest
Hungarian footballers
Association football forwards
Ferencvárosi TC footballers
MTK Budapest FC players
Oldham Athletic A.F.C. players
Norbert Csiki
Gyirmót FC Győr players
Vasas SC players
Budaörsi SC footballers
Kaposvári Rákóczi FC players
Balassagyarmati SE footballers
Nemzeti Bajnokság I players
Nemzeti Bajnokság II players
Norbert Csiki
Hungarian expatriate footballers
Hungarian expatriate sportspeople in England
Hungarian expatriate sportspeople in Thailand
Expatriate footballers in England
Expatriate footballers in Thailand